En plats i solen may refer to:

En plats i solen (Lustans Lakejer album), by Lustans Lakejer (1982)
En plats i solen (Grönwalls album) (1994)
En plats i solen (Kent album) (2010)
...och en plats i Solen, a line of the 1986 Kikki Danielsson song "Papaya Coconut"

See also
A Place in the Sun (disambiguation)
Platz an der Sonne